Corazón is the twenty-third studio album (thirty-seventh album overall) by Santana, released on May 6, 2014.

Produced by Lester Mendez, the album features collaborations with various singers like Gloria Estefan, Ziggy Marley and Cindy Blackman.

"La Flaca" featuring Juanes, the first single from the album, was released in November 2013. The album was certified double platinum in the Latin by the RIAA for shipping over 120,000 copies in the United States; furthermore, it has sold over 95,000 copies in the country according to Nielsen SoundScan.

Track listing

Standard edition

Latin American edition

Personnel 
 Carlos Santana – lead guitar on all tracks except "Una Noche en Nápoles", in which he plays the twelve-string guitar and the classical guitar; percussion (tracks 8, 10, 11); producing and mixing (tracks 10, 11); arranger (tracks 2, 4, 5, 7, 10, 11, 12)

Musicians 

Additional vocalists
 Vicentico – vocals on "Mal Bicho" (track 3)
 Larissa R. Nascimento – background vocals on "Beijo de Longe" (track 14)
 Jovany Javier & Ximena Muñoz – vocal performance on "Oye 2014" (track 4)
 Tommy Anthony, Tony Lindsay and Andy Vargas – vocals on "Yo Soy La Luz" (track 11)

Guitars and bass
 Tommy Anthony – rhythm guitar (all tracks except 3, 8, 9)
 Tim Pierce – rhythm guitar (tracks 1, 2, 4, 5)
 Samuel Rosa – rhythm guitar on "Saideira" (tracks 1, 13)
 Miguel – rhythm guitar on "Indy" (track 9)
 Emily Stefan – additional guitars on "Beijo de Longe" (track 14)
 Benny Rietveld – bass (all tracks except 3, 8, 9)
 Flavio Cianciarulo – bass and rhythm guitar on "Mal Bicho" (track 3)

Keyboards
 David K. Mathews – keyboards (all tracks except 8 and 9)
 Zac Rae – keyboards (all tracks except 6 and 8–11)
 Mario Siperman – keyboards on "La Flaca" (track 2)
 Lester Mendez – keyboard programming on "I See Your Face" (track 12)

Percussion
 Dennis Chambers – drums (tracks 1, 2, 4, 6, 7, 12))
 Fernando Ricciardi – drums on "Mal Bicho" (track 3)
 Cindy Blackman-Santana – drums on "Yo Soy La Luz" (track 11) and "I See Your Face" (track 12)
 Josh Connolly – drum programming on "Mal Bicho" (track 3)
 Karl Perazzo – timbales (all tracks except 8, 9, 11); percussion (tracks 4, 5, 7, 8, 10, 12)
 Raul Rekow – congas (tracks 1, 2, 5, 6, 12)
 Paoli Mijias – congas (tracks 3, 4, 7, 10, 11)
 Laercio da Costa – additional percussion on "Beijo de Longe" (track 14)

Brass
 Jeff Cressman – trombone on "Saideira" (tracks 1 & 13) and "Yo Soy La Luz" (track 11)
 David Stout – trombone and horn arrangement on "Iron Lion Zion" (track 5)
 Bill Ortiz – trumpet on "Saideira" (tracks 1 & 13) and "Yo Soy La Luz" (track 11)
 Daniel Lozano – trumpet on "Mal Bicho" (track 3)
 Harry Kim – trumpet on "Iron Lion Zion" (track 5)
 Sergio Rotman – tenor saxophone on "Mal Bicho" (track 3)
 Dave Pozzi – tenor saxophone on "Iron Lion Zion" (track 5)
 Wayne Shorter – saxophone on "Yo Soy La Luz" (track 11)

Other instruments
 Pedro Alfonso – violin on "Beijo de Longe" (track 14)

Technical staff 

 Chris Gehringer – mastering 
 Clive Davis, Carlos Santana, Afo Verde, Michael Vrionis and Tom Corson – executive producers
 Alex Gallardo and Fernando Cabral de Mello – A&R
 La Fábrica de Pepinos de Boa Mistura – album artwork & psychedelia
 Shawn "Tubby" Holiday – A&R (tracks 8 and 9)
 Lourival Rodriguez – Director, Editor and Video producer of the documentary "Santana: The Making of Corazón"
 Ruslan Shakirov – Co-director, Editor, Credits animation and Video producer of the documentary "Santana: The Making of Corazón"

Producing
 Lester Mendez
 Miguel ("Indy") (track 9)
 The Cataracs ("Oye 2014") (track 4)
 Cindy Blackman Santana – co-producer on "Yo Soy La Luz" (track 11)

Mixing
 Tony Maserati
 Manny Marroquin ("Indy") (track 9)
 Justin Hergett – mix engineering (tracks 1, 7, 9)
 James Krausse – mix engineering (tracks 2, 3, 12)
 Matt Wiggers – mix engineering (tracks 4, 5)
 Chris Galland and Delbert Bowers – assistant mixers on "Indy" (track 9)

Engineering
 Bill Malina – recording engineer
 Jim Reitzel – guitar engineer (all tracks except 7–10); recording engineer (tracks 6, 8, 9, 10, 11); mixer and mixing engineer (tracks 10, 11)
 Josh Connolly – assistant engineer at Odd On Studios
 Dave Diffin – assistant engineer at Odd on studios (tracks 1 and 3)
 Scott Moore – assistant engineer at Ocean Way Recording on "Iron Lion Zion" (track 5)

"Beijo de Longe"/"Besos de Lejos" (track 14)
 Emilio Estefan – producer
 Javier Conde Alonso – arranger
 Eric Schilling – mixer
 Tuco Barini – recording engineer (percussion in Brazil)
 Dave Poler – vocal engineering
 Izzy Maccio and Jimmy Sanchez – assistant engineers
 Ron Taylor and Danny Ponce – additional engineering 
 Kurt Berge – technical support
 José Maldonado – production manager

Reception

Critical reception

The album received mixed to positive reviews by critics. Rolling Stone's Will Hermes considered the album a Latin pop version of Supernatural and that its music "remains an unmistakable, undeniable sound". Thom Jurek from AllMusic felt "Santana actually sounds hungry again" and stated that "while some of these cuts are forgettable, his inventive engagement with Latin pop here is not only successful, but satisfying". Billboard's Leila Cobo considered the album to be guitar-driven despite the many vocalists. Overall, she praised the album, but pointed a few songs that she considered not to have worked, such as "Feel It Coming Back", in which she felt that Diego Torres struggled with the language; and "Indy", in which Miguel's improvisations "lack structure and tend to meander". Jeremy Williams-Chalmers from So So Gay felt the album might "be the record that finally knocks Supernatural off its throne as Santana's definitive release" and considered it to be "everything a Santana record needs to be", while joining Cobo on criticizing Torres' English skills. The Independent's Nick Coleman said the album "contains a brightly recorded, punchy collection of 'Latin' beats and melodies, plus some rock, featuring a handful of distinguished guests and the familiar overflying drone of Carlos's own guitar obbligati" and that it "is certain to be a hit in its target territories".

Relix's Bill Murphy considered Carlos Santana's guitar playing in the album to be the "best he's done in decades" and felt that "where too many cooks may have overwhelmed Supernatural, Corazón simmers with spicy variety". Jon Pareles, writing for The New York Times, considered the songs to be radio-aimed and described the contrast between Santana's guitar and the guest singers vocals as follows: "The way Mr. Santana answers the lyrics and grapples for the foreground until verse and chorus gave way to full-fledged guitar solos is the audio equivalent of photobombing the lead vocal. Luckily, Mr. Santana's guitar can be as impassioned as any singer's voice." However, he considered some tracks (such as "Oye 2014" and "Yo Soy La Luz") to be "awkward moments".

Writing for New York Daily News, Jim Farber was not so impressed by the album. He criticized it being promoted as a Latin pop album while having half of its lyrics in English. He also saw negatively the artists chosen for this album: "Santana's glistening leads compete with, rather than complement, these artists. [...] Latin alternative music features so many artists who would have paired better with Santana's style. [...] Wrangling artists like those would have made this album a true first". Ultimate Guitar Archive's team felt Santana himself had little space in some of the songs and considered the album to be "a compilation of well formulated, radio-friendly Latino pop which often times ends up sounding somewhat bizarre". They also labeled the lyrics as "repetitive" and concluded by saying: "The outcome which appears on [...] Corazon falls short of any preset expectations. [...] Considering the album's pop-driven outcome it leaves the listener puzzled as to where Santana was hoping to proceed with this effort".

Accolades 
The album was nominated for Best Contemporary Pop Vocal Album at the Latin Grammy Awards of 2014.

Charts

Weekly charts

Year-end charts

Certifications

References

2014 albums
Santana (band) albums